At least eight special routes of U.S. Route 22 have existed.

Existing

Monroeville business loop

U.S. Route 22 Business is a 5-mile loop through the eastern Pittsburgh suburbs of Churchill, Wilkins Township, and Monroeville, Pennsylvania, on William Penn Highway. The route's western terminus is at a freeway junction with Interstate 376, which features a concurrency by the business loop's parent route. The route was the former pathway of U.S. Route 22 itself before the construction that extended Interstate 376 from this point eastward to the Pennsylvania Turnpike, in the early 1960s. The first two miles of the road are contained in a valley, surrounded by a variety of side roads leading to suburban, mostly residential development. The remaining three miles feature dense commercial development, including several office high rises and the Monroeville Mall. The highway ends at a complicated junction that features the northern terminus of Pennsylvania Route 48, the southern end of Haymaker Road, and Interstate 376, which features its last two exits (before the Pennsylvania Turnpike) with the above streets. Business US 22 then travels for its final eighth of a mile on a viaduct that allows for connections with the Pennsylvania Turnpike and a smooth transition on to US 22 east (continuing William Penn Highway) toward suburban Murrysville.

Major intersections

Lewistown business loop

U.S. Route 22 Business is a 5-mile loop through Lewistown, Pennsylvania. It serves as the major through street, taking on the former designation of its parent, which has become a freeway bypass. The first two miles of the route travel through rural Granville Township. The middle two mile segment is lined with small development and features several stop lights and a segment that contains a center turning lane. The last two miles wind along the Juniata River toward the eastern freeway juncture.

Major intersections

Former

Green Tree–Pittsburgh temporary route

Pittsburgh truck route

Harrisburg bypass route

U.S. Route 22 Bypass was a bypass of the routing of US 22 through downtown Harrisburg, Pennsylvania from the 1930s to 1978. The bypass began at US 22/US 322 (Front Street/2nd Street) along the Susquehanna River and headed east on Maclay Street. Upon intersecting PA 230 (Cameron Street), US 22 Byp. ran southeast on Arsenal Boulevard and east on Herr Street before it reached its eastern terminus at US 22 (Walnut Street) near Penbrook. US 22 Byp. was first designated by 1940 between US 22 and US 230 at the intersection of Cameron and Maclay streets in Harrisburg and US 22 near Penbrook, following Arsenal Boulevard and Herr Street. In the 1940s, US 22 Byp. was extended west along Maclay Street to end at US 22/US 322/PA 14 (Front Street), running concurrent with US 230. In the 1950s, the route east of US 230 became concurrent with US 230 Byp. The US 230 and US 230 Byp. concurrencies were removed during the 1960s. On June 29, 1978, the American Association of State Highway Transportation Officials approved the removal of the US 22 Byp. designation; the route was replaced by US 22 along Arsenal Boulevard and Herr Street.

Major intersections

Bethlehem–Easton alternate route

U.S. Route 22 Alternate was an alternate route of US 22 that ran between the cities of Bethlehem and Easton in Pennsylvania between the 1930s and 1950s. The alternate route began at US 22 and PA 12 at the intersection of Main and Union streets in downtown Bethlehem, heading east on Union Street. The route briefly turned north along Linden Street before it headed east on Goepp Street, which became Pembroke Road as it left Bethlehem. US 22 Alt. became Freemansburg Avenue and passed through Freemansburg. The route continued east to Wilson, where it came to its eastern terminus at US 22 (Butler Street). US 22 Alt. was first designated in the 1930s, beginning at US 22 and PA 12 at the intersection of Main and Goepp streets in Bethlehem and following Goepp Street, Pembroke Road, and Freemansburg Avenue to US 22 at Butler Street in Wilson. In the 1940s, US 22 Alt. was shifted to use Union Street to intersect US 22 and PA 12 in Bethlehem. The US 22 Alt. designation was decommissioned during the 1950s.

Major intersections

Phillipsburg alternate route

U.S. Route 22 Alternate was an alternate route of US 22 located in  Phillipsburg, New Jersey. The route began at the Northampton Street Bridge over the Delaware River to Easton, Pennsylvania. From here, the alternate route followed South Main Street through Phillipsburg. US 22 Alt. headed into Pohatcong Township and became New Brunswick Avenue. Here, the route formed a short concurrency with CR 519 and continued east to its eastern terminus at US 22. US 22 Alt. was first designated in the 1940s to run along the former alignment of US 22 through Easton and Phillipsburg that was bypassed. The alternate route began at US 22 at the intersection of 7th and Northampton streets in Easton and ran east along Northampton Street to the Northampton Street Bridge into New Jersey. At this point, US 22 Alt. became concurrent with Route 28 and ran through Phillipsburg on South Main Street and Pohatcong Township on New Brunswick Avenue before ending at US 22. In the 1953 New Jersey state highway renumbering, the concurrent Route 28 designation in New Jersey was removed. During the 1950s, the western terminus of US 22 Alt. was moved to the Northampton Street Bridge, with PA 45 replacing the route along Northampton Street in Easton. On October 23, 1993, the American Association of State Highway Transportation Officials approved the removal of the US 22 Alt. designation. The route was replaced by CR 678 and Route 122.

Major intersections

Easton–Phillipsburg bypass route

U.S. Route 22 Bypass was the designation for a bypass of the segment of US 22 through the downtown areas of Easton, Pennsylvania and Phillipsburg, New Jersey between the 1930s and the 1940s. The bypass began at US 22 (Northampton Street) in Easton and headed northeast on Prospect Avenue, Pearl Street, and Bushkill Street, intersecting US 611 (3rd Street). The route crossed the Delaware River on the Easton–Phillipsburg Toll Bridge into New Jersey, where it ran east concurrent with Route 24 on Morris Street. US 22 Byp. turned southeast along Route 24-28 Link to end at US 22/Route 28 in Pohatcong Township. The bypass route was designated in the 1930s. In the 1940s, US 22 Byp. was replaced with mainline US 22, with the former alignment of US 22 through Easton and Phillipsburg becoming US 22 Alt.

Major intersections

See also

References

 
22
22
22